Kengere is a 2010 Ugandan documentary film.

Synopsis 
In 1989, Ugandan Army soldiers accused 69 people of being rebels and locked them in train wagons, then set fire to them. Kengere tells the story of a cyclist who returns to his home village in search of a tape that contains evidence of the crime.

External links 

2010 animated films
2010 films
2010 short documentary films
Ugandan documentary films
2010s animated short films
Animated documentary films
Ugandan animated short films